Turatia psammella is a moth in the family Autostichidae. It was described by Hans Georg Amsel in 1933 and is found in Palestine.

References

Moths described in 1933
Turatia